...Un Sol (also known as 1 + 1 = 2 Enamorados) is the debut studio album by Mexican singer Luis Miguel. Released in 1982, when Miguel was eleven years old. The album peaked at #2 at the California's "Hot Latin LPs". 

Four songs from the album were versioned into Portuguese and released in two different singles in Brazil. According to the Brazilian newspaper A Luta Democrática, the single "1 + 1 = Dois Apaixonados" was certified gold there while the single "Mentira" sold 80,000 copies in the country. The success motivated the label to plan an album by the singer with songs in Brazilian Portuguese.

According to different sources the album sold around 700,000 copies in Miguel home country, earning a gold and platinum certification there, or even one million copies in Mexico only. In Argentina it sold over 10,000 copies.

Track listing 
Source

Musical direction and arrangements by Chucho Ferrer except (*) Peque Rossino.

References 

1982 debut albums
Luis Miguel albums
EMI Records albums
Spanish-language albums